Bishop's Castle Community College is a coeducational secondary school located in Bishop's Castle in the English county of Shropshire.

Established in 1922 as Bishop's Castle County High School, today it is a foundation school administered by Shropshire Council. The school admits pupils from Bishop's Castle and surrounding villages.

The school offers GCSEs and BTECs as programmes of study for pupils.

References

External links
Bishop's Castle Community College official website

Educational institutions established in 1922
1922 establishments in England
Secondary schools in Shropshire
Foundation schools in Shropshire
Bishop's Castle